Samurai X may refer to:

 Nya and P I.X.A.L., fictional characters in the Lego Ninjago theme and its adaptations
 Rurouni Kenshin (1996 TV series), a Japanese anime television series